Lailee Inez Bakhtiar (née McNair, formerly van Dillen; born June 10, 1951), is an American poet and novelist. Published in 2021, Esther Entering Your Destiny is the author's new non-fiction book about the historical and Biblical figure of Esther of the Old Testament Book of Esther. This analysis of Esther from the Bible describes her courage, influence, and spiritual role in ancient times.

Early life and education 
Bakhtiar's father was Frederick Vallette McNair III, born in 1922 in Annapolis, Maryland, and served in World War II in the Pacific. Her grandfather, Captain Frederick Vallette McNair Jr., U.S. Naval Academy class of 1903, was awarded the Congressional Medal of Honor, and her great-grandfather Rear Admiral Frederick Vallette McNair, class of 1857, was a USNA former superintendent in 1898.

Her mother Parveen Bakhtiar, born in Tehran, Iran, is a professional artist. Her art works are archived by the National Museum of Women in the Arts in Washington, D.C. Her grandfather was Dr. Abol Hassan Bakhtiar of Borujen and grandmother, a nurse, Helen Jeffreys Bakhtiar of Weiser, Idaho. As a couple they participated in health care for the tribal nomads. Lailee McNair's aunts included the McNair sisters: Margaret, Valette, Duer, Janet, Elizabeth, Clara, and Betsy, the daughters of Captain and Mrs. McNair, all who were descended from Scottish and English families who came to the U.S., in Newtown, Pennsylvania, and had long established traditions. Parveen's sister and Lailee McNair's other aunt was Mary Nell, later known as Laleh, a psychologist and scholar.

Bakhtiar was born in Washington, D.C., and named after her mother's favorite poet, Nizami, and his poem, Layla and Majnun. Another aunt was also named Lailee. She was raised in Chevy Chase Village, Montgomery County, Maryland, with her parents Frederick and Parveen McNair and her five brothers: Frederick V. McNair IV, John, Bruce, David, and James. She attends St. John's Episcopal Church in Chevy Chase, Maryland. As Lailee McNair, she began her community service as Miss 16 of Washington, D.C. in 1966. Upon graduation from UNC in Chapel Hill, North Carolina, Bakhtiar moved to New York City, where she was a flight attendant for Pan American Airlines in 1973. She speaks two languages: English and French, and studied Spanish, Persian, and Arabic.

Bakhtiar obtained a Bachelor of Arts in French from the University of North Carolina at Chapel Hill in 1973 and also a Master in Arts in Teaching French, MAT, from Notre Dame de Namur University, Belmont, California, in 1979. Her novels Harem Letters and sequel They Shake the Desert Sands were inspired by her study of Montesquieu's Persian Letters. She matriculated in courses on journalism, short story writing, and creative writing under Dr. Jim Bell of College of San Mateo, R. B. Sweet of San Jose State University, and courses offered by the local conferences. She was on the board of the local Peninsula Press Club and the Burlingame Library Foundation.

In Annapolis, she obtained certification in Year 1 & Year 2 in the C. S. Lewis Fellows Program. She was inspired in her faith. Her previous study of Blaise Pascal and Victor Hugo continued.

Career
Noted for her poetry: City Dock Poetry (2014), Chai (1998), and Mending Nations (2000), she was one of the participants in the Los Angeles Times Festival of Books, August 1999; The San Francisco Bay Area Book Festival, November 1998; and The National Press Club 21st Annual Book Fair, Washington, D.C., November 1998. Her nonfiction book Afghanistan's Blue Treasure Lapis Lazuli (2011) has an introduction by Dr. Pierre Bariand former curator of the Pierre and Marie Curie Museum at the Sorbonne.

Broadcast TV
Bakhtiar was the former host/producer of a local show Writers Forum and Book Review (1985–2000) hosting 50 programs for Washington Post/Newsweek Cable TV in Burlingame, California followed by her hosting/producing a community book program for PBS-KCSM TV, Authors & Critics, a television series in San Mateo, CA for ten years (1990–2000), including a total of 117 programs that was offered nationally to PBS affiliates as announced by Publishers Weekly on December 7, 1998.

Journalist 
During her time on the Grand Prix tennis tour with her husband Erik van Dillen she wrote 50 articles for sport magazines in 7 countries (France, Luxembourg, Netherlands, Singapore, England, Austria, and the United States) on tennis professionals Chris Evert, Jimmy Connors, Bjorn Borg, John McEnroe, and others in Tennis World Magazine in England where she was a contributing editor as well as Tennis in Singapore. She wrote articles on the Honorable Andrew Young, former mayor of Atlanta and a former United Nations Ambassador, and Becky London, the daughter of author Jack London.

Speaker 
Bakhtiar spoke as one of the participants at the UNESCO Culture of Peace: Women Making It Happen at the Dag Hammarskjold Auditorium, United Nations, New York, on March 2, 2000. She participated in The Gulf and The Globe Conference 2009 at the United States Naval Academy in Annapolis. Her speeches to local events included Women in Communication, American Association of University Women, and the Jack London Writers Conference.

Personal life 
She was married at All Saints Episcopal Church, Chevy Chase in November 1974 to tennis pro and Davis Cup player Erik van Dillen. She is the sister of Fred McNair, a tennis champion at the French Open Doubles in Paris. Bakhtiar traveled for nine years on the men's professional tennis tour around the world to the Grand Prix tennis tournaments.

Bakhtiar had three children, Vincent, Soraya, and Hague.

She currently resides in Annapolis, Maryland, living near the Severn River close to her family's ancestral home. Bakhtiar was a civilian volunteer for the United States Naval Academy Protestant Sunday school program for ten years (2003–2013).

Bakhtiar's cousin is author and journalist Davar Ardalan. Laleh Bakhtiar was also Ardalan's mother. Laleh's brother and Lailee's uncle Jamshidi "Jim" Bakhtiar worked as a psychiatrist; he was a fullback/placekicker at the University of Virginia. Jim was selected by the Football Writers Association of America as a first-team back on its 1957 College Football All-America Team.

Bakhtiar's recent publication in ReDux Extra features her 2021 book, Esther Entering Your Destiny: Knock and It Shall Be Opened. Her most recent non-fiction book, award the 2021 prize for biography and fiction from the National Federation of Press Women. She is a member of the Annapolis Arts Alliance, the Maryland Writers Association, World Wings International (former Pan Am flight attendants), the Women's International Group of Annapolis, the Annapolis International Book Club and is presently working on a trilogy of fantasy novels based on and inspired by the apologetics works of CS Lewis.  As graduate of the C. S. Lewis Fellows Program Years 1 and 2, and a mentorship year, she is a Christian apologist.

Other works 
 City Dock Poetryl, Mending Nations poetry, Chai poetry, The Roses of Isfahan short stories & poetry, Afghanistan's Blue Treasure Lapis Lazuli, They Shake the Desert Sands, novel, Harem Letters, novelMidnight Tales, a children's book

References

External links

 
  (Dec 24, 2020) 

1951 births
Living people
American women novelists
American television personalities
American women television personalities
American women journalists
Notre Dame de Namur University alumni
University of North Carolina at Chapel Hill alumni
Writers from Washington, D.C.
20th-century American novelists
21st-century American novelists
20th-century American women writers
21st-century American women writers
20th-century American non-fiction writers
21st-century American non-fiction writers
American writers of Iranian descent
Bakhtiari people
Episcopalians from Maryland